The Looming Fog is the 2006 debut novel by the Nigerian writer, Rosemary Esehagu. The story follows the life of an intersex child as they struggle to live in a pre-colonial village in Nigeria that considers the anomaly an abomination.

Through this nameless protagonist and narrator, one becomes aware of other members of this small society, including the second main character, Kayinne, who is the only surviving child of an elderly couple. She must battle with her society concerning her desire to become a healer — a major taboo for a woman in Nigerian society.

2006 novels
Novels about intersex
Nigerian English-language novels
Nigerian LGBT novels
2006 debut novels